The 2004 IIFA Awards, officially known as the 5th International Indian Film Academy Awards  ceremony, presented by the International Indian Film Academy honored the best films of 2003 and took place between 20 and 22 May 2004. This year, the city of Singapore played host to the Indian Film Industry. The tag line of this year's IIFA Awards was Uniquely IIFA, Uniquely Singapore ....

The official ceremony took place on 22 May 2004, at the Singapore Indoor Stadium, in Esplanade Concert Hall, Singapore. During the ceremony, IIFA Awards were awarded in 27 competitive categories. The ceremony was televised in India and internationally on Star Plus. Actors Rahul Khanna hosted the ceremony.

Kal Ho Naa Ho led the ceremony with 17 nominations, followed by Munna Bhai M.B.B.S. with 12 nominations and Koi... Mil Gaya with 11 nominations.

Kal Ho Naa Ho won 13 awards, including Best Film, Best Actress (for Preity Zinta), Best Supporting Actor (for Saif Ali Khan) and Best Supporting Actress (for Jaya Bachchan), thus becoming the most–awarded film at the ceremony.

Other multiple awards winners included Koi... Mil Gaya with 5 awards, Munna Bhai M.B.B.S. with 4 awards and Ishq Vishk with 2 awards.

In addition, movies receiving a single award included LOC Kargil (Best Sound Re–Recording), Jism (Best Female Playback Singer) and Janasheen (Best Villain).

Preity Zinta received dual nominations for Best Actress for her performances in Kal Ho Naa Ho and Koi... Mil Gaya, winning for the former, her first and only win in the category.

Background
The awards began in 2000 and the first ceremony was held in London at The Millennium Dome. From then on the awards were held at locations around the world signifying the international success of Bollywood. The next award ceremony was announced to be held at Amsterdam Arena in Amsterdam, Netherlands in 2005.

Singapore also hosted the 2012 IIFA Awards.

Winners and nominees
Winners are listed first and highlighted in boldface.

thumb

Popular awards

Musical awards

Backstage awards

Technical awards

Special awards

Outstanding Contribution to Indian Cinema
 Yash Johar

Outstanding Achievement In Indian Cinema
 Dilip Kumar

Samsung Diva
 Kareena Kapoor

Samsung Style Icon
 Saif Ali Khan

Sony face of the year – Male
 Shahid Kapoor

Sony face of the year – Female
 Amrita Rao

Multiple nominations and awards

The following eleven films received multiple nominations:
 Seventeen: Kal Ho Naa Ho
 Twelve: Munna Bhai M.B.B.S.
 Eleven: Koi... Mil Gaya
 Seven: Tere Naam
 Six: Baghban and LOC Kargil
 Four: Janasheen
 Three: Hungama , Jism and Jhankaar Beats
 Two: Ishq Vishk 

The following films received multiple awards:
 Thirteen: Kal Ho Naa Ho
 Five: Koi... Mil Gaya
 Four: Munna Bhai M.B.B.S.
 Two: Ishq Vishk and Jism

References

External links

Iifa Awards
IIFA awards